The 1963–64 NBA season was the 18th season of the National Basketball Association.  The season ended with the Boston Celtics winning their 6th straight NBA Championship, beating the San Francisco Warriors 4 games to 1 in the NBA Finals.

Notable occurrences 
 The Syracuse Nationals move from Syracuse, New York to Philadelphia and become the Philadelphia 76ers. No major professional sports franchises have returned to Syracuse.
 The Chicago Zephyrs move from Chicago to Baltimore and become the new Baltimore Bullets, leaving Chicago with no NBA team until the birthlaunch of the Bulls in 1966.
 The 1964 NBA All-Star Game was played at the Boston Garden in Boston, with the East beating the West 111–107. Oscar Robertson of the Cincinnati Royals won the game's MVP award.
 Alex Hannum of the San Francisco Warriors wins the inaugural NBA Coach of the Year Award.

Season recap
The NBA continued to increase its interests this season, setting another attendance record and increasing its revenue from televised games. The growing interest in the league was certainly  a direct result of the arrival of talented players from the college ranks. Players arriving in the league in recent seasons still rank among the greatest to ever play in the NBA decades later.

Leading teams 
Two teams dominated much of the league's attention this year.

Celtics 
The first were the Boston Celtics, which had by now become the game's greatest dynasty ever.
Retirement had claimed 50s superstar Bob Cousy but Red Auerbach's club barely slowed down with his absence. Cousy's replacement was a defensive specialist named K.C. Jones, who continued Auerbach's emphasis on defense along with forward Tom 'Satch' Sanders and center Bill Russell. While Boston could surely still pass and score, it was their defensive emergence, led by the incredible Russell, that was now leading a streak of NBA titles. Russell led the league in rebounds and was one of two high-volume shot blockers now dominating the NBA. 
The Celtics had six scorers over ten-points per game and two more over eight. Auerbach's sixth man, John Havlicek, was the team's leading scorer at 20 per game. This combination of active defense and unselfish shooting got Boston a league-high 59 wins in 80 NBA games.

Royals 
Few considered the Celtics beatable, but the Cincinnati Royals surprised and excited fans with their team this year, easily the NBA's most popular. Coach Jack McMahon, a former Royals player from their Rochester days, finally got his man to help superstar Oscar Robertson.
Jerry Lucas had arrived from the folded ABL and immediately elevated his club to contender. He led the league in shooting accuracy at 53%, but was careful not to disrupt the established shooting of Robertson, Jack Twyman and Wayne Embry. Lucas was also third in the NBA in rebounds and a willing passer. The most popular player in Ohio history, thanks to his now-legendary high school and college career, Lucas was a boost to attendance at home and on the road as well.
Lucas was the fourth straight Rookie of the Year named who had starred on the 1960 U.S. Olympic basketball squad, which, decades later, is still considered by many as the best amateur team ever. The Royals roster had, at one point, five members of that roster this year.

Overshadowed slightly by Lucas's arrival, Oscar Robertson still had an MVP-caliber year with another legendary performance for the Royals. His 840 field goals made were second in the league, boosted further by an NBA-high 800 free throws made at an 85% clip. By the strict rules of the day, Robertson still averaged eleven assists per game, quarterbacking the league's best offense. The racehorse game now being played produced plenty of available rebounds. Robertson, likely the best rebounding guard ever, hauled down an average of nine per game. It was another rare all-around performance that had some wondering if Robertson, not Wilt Chamberlain or Bill Russell, was the greatest player in league history.
Robertson's 31.4 points per game led a balanced lineup for the Royals that won 55 games, chasing Boston hotly all season long.

Warriors 
After these 50-game winners in the East Division, there were also three 40-game winners in the West Division of the NBA this year.

The San Francisco Warriors, in their second season in California, won the West with 48 wins in 80 NBA games. Their leader was again superstar Wilt Chamberlain. Wilt tried 2298 shots in his 80 games, easily a league high, and made a league-high 1204 field goals at a 52% clip. A poor foul shooter, Wilt still had a league-high 1016 tries to help boost his 36.9 scoring average, which again led all NBA players. Wilt was second in rebounds, first or second in shots blocked, and first in minutes played with an average of 46 minutes per 48-minute NBA game. Expanding his game to include passing, Wilt edged past Russell to finish sixth in the NBA assists column as well.
The Warriors had five other ten-point scorers and a potential future star in rookie Nate Thurmond under coach Alex Hannum.

Hawks 
Second in the West were the St. Louis Hawks, led by Bob Pettit. The 31-year-old star was fourth in the NBA in scoring and fifth in rebounds. His 608 free throws made were second-most in the league also. Coach Harry Gallatin's starting five had balanced support for Pettit, and a number of former ABL stars on the bench, including Bill Bridges.

Lakers 
The Los Angeles Lakers went 42–38 in their fourth year in California. They were led by the super tandem of Jerry West and Elgin Baylor. West threw in 28.7 points per game with 48% shooting from the floor and 83% shooting from the foul line. With an all-around game that rivaled Oscar Robertson's, West added six assists and six rebounds per game and excellent defense in the backcourt that produced a number of steals each game.
Every bit West's equal was Baylor. The 29-year-old averaged 25.4 points per game. The 6'6 forward also hauled in twelve rebounds per game and dished 4.4 assists. Fred Schaus's starting five well-supported the two big stars and the Lakers also had a good bench, but so-so center play continued to be the team's Achille's heel. Baylor, in fact, sometimes had to play that position himself, another example of his incredible all-around game.

Bullets 
The Baltimore Bullets played their first NBA season in the West Division, making the former Chicago club a curiosity. The impact of this is that the Cincinnati Royals would have to beat Boston to make the NBA Finals, their second-best league record notwithstanding. San Francisco, with the league's third-best mark, would have the clear shot from the West instead.

Postseason 
Three teams in each division made the playoffs, with the second and third place teams meeting in the first round. The division winner then met that winner in the second round to produce NBA Finalists. Only three NBA teams out of nine failed to make those playoffs.
Cincinnati edged the 34–46 Philadelphia 76ers three games to two in a surprisingly close series where each team won their home games. Cincinnati, luckily, had three of them.
The St. Louis Hawks beat the Lakers 3–2 along the same lines.
A rested Boston club sent the Royals a clear message in the East Final in winning four of five games. Coach Jack McMahon had been roundly criticized for trading reserve forward Bob Boozer at mid-season. Boozer had become a reserve with the arrival of Lucas. Now a starter for lowly New York Knicks, the Royals clearly missed their former teammate at playoff time when bench depth is a key consideration. San Francisco dismissed the Hawks four games to three. A knee injury to St. Louis center Zelmo Beaty limited his effectiveness.

Finals 
A classic Russell vs. Wilt matchup marked the NBA Finals. Chamberlain tried and made the most shots, tried the most free throws, pulled down the most rebounds, and perhaps blocked the most shots of any player in the playoffs by a clear margin. But he and his supporting cast were no match for Boston, who got strong performances from Sam Jones and John Havlicek, while Russell nearly matched rebounds and blocks with Wilt in the middle. The series only went five games, with Boston clearly the winner in four of them.
Boston had won eight of ten games decisively against the league's next two best records to clearly prove they were in their own class as basketball's best team.

Final standings

Eastern Division

Western Division

x – clinched playoff spot

Playoff bracket

Statistics leaders

Note: Prior to the 1969–70 season, league leaders in points, rebounds, and assists were determined by totals rather than averages.

NBA awards
Most Valuable Player: Oscar Robertson, Cincinnati Royals
Rookie of the Year: Jerry Lucas, Cincinnati Royals
Coach of the Year: Alex Hannum, San Francisco Warriors

All-NBA First Team:
F – Bob Pettit, St. Louis Hawks
F – Elgin Baylor, Los Angeles Lakers
C – Wilt Chamberlain, San Francisco Warriors
G – Jerry West, Los Angeles Lakers
G – Oscar Robertson, Cincinnati Royals

All-NBA Second Team:
G – Hal Greer, Philadelphia 76ers  
G – John Havlicek, Boston Celtics
F – Tom Heinsohn, Boston Celtics
F – Jerry Lucas, Cincinnati Royals
C – Bill Russell, Boston Celtics

NBA All-Rookie First Team:
Art Heyman, New York Knicks
Gus Johnson, Baltimore Bullets
Jerry Lucas, Cincinnati Royals
Rod Thorn, Baltimore Bullets
Nate Thurmond, San Francisco Warriors

References
1963–64 NBA Season Summary, basketball-reference.com. Retrieved March 30, 2010.